Jiru may refer to:
Jiru language, a language of Nigeria
Jiru, a town in Moretna Jiru, Ethiopia
Ji Ru, a historical figure of the early Han Empire
Chen Jiru, Chinese painter

See also 
 Djiru (disambiguation)
 Giru (disambiguation)